Royal Stables may refer to:

Royal Mews, United Kingdom
Royal Stables (Denmark)
Royal Stables (Netherlands)
Royal Stables (Sweden)
Royal Stables of Córdoba, Spain